"Afterlife" is a song by Avenged Sevenfold. The song is released as the third single from their self-titled album. The song itself features a string orchestra and was written by the band's drummer, The Rev. The single and music video were released in early 2008.

Music video
The music video, which released on March 12, 2008, consists of the band performing on a small stage. There are also clips of M. Shadows running shirtless, Zacky Vengeance dancing with a woman, Synyster Gates holding a skull in a sea of lit candles, The Rev lying down with a Spider on his face, and Johnny Christ holding a flock of doves which he sends flying off all at once at the end of the video. The music video was directed by Wayne Isham, who has shot videos for bands like Bon Jovi, Judas Priest and Mötley Crüe.

In the album version, there is a string section in the intro and later in the song, both of which are cut out of the video, along with the bridge of the song, which features The Rev's vocals.

Lyrical meaning 
According to Zacky Vengeance the song is about a man who dies early and finds himself in heaven. Upon entering, he realizes that he has too many things to do on Earth and to go back and make it right, he must escape from the afterlife.

Other appearances
The song is available as downloadable content for Rock Band and Guitar Hero 5, and is featured in the video game NHL 09. It was released for Rocksmith on October 30, 2012. The song is also available on the game Rock Band Track Pack: Volume 2.

An alternate version of the song is included in the compilation album Live in the LBC & Diamonds in the Rough, released on September 16, 2008. The alternate version has a prominent string section through the whole duration of the song, as well as a different bridge in comparison with the original song.

Track listing 

Promo single
 "Afterlife" (radio edit) – 4:02

Single
 "Afterlife" (album version) – 5:54
 "Critical Acclaim" (live in Hollywood) – 5:22

Chart positions

Personnel
Avenged Sevenfold
M. Shadows – lead vocals, backing vocals
Zacky Vengeance – rhythm guitar, backing vocals
The Rev - drums, percussion, piano, backing vocals, co-lead vocals
Synyster Gates – lead guitar, backing vocals
Johnny Christ – bass guitar, backing vocals

Session musicians
Upright bass by Miles Mosley
Cello by Cameron Stone
Violins by Caroline Campbell and Neel Hammond
Viola by Andrew Duckles
Production
Produced by Avenged Sevenfold
Engineered by Fred Archambault and Dave Schiffman, assisted by Clifton Allen, Chris Steffen, Robert DeLong, Aaron Walk, Mike Scielzi, and Josh Wilbur
Mixed by Andy Wallace
Mastered by Brian Gardner
Drum tech by Mike Fasano
Guitar tech by Walter Rice
'Fan Producers for a Day' (MVI) by Daniel McLaughlin and Christopher Guinn

References 

Avenged Sevenfold songs
2007 songs
2008 singles
Music videos directed by Wayne Isham
Songs containing the I–V-vi-IV progression
Thrash metal songs
Symphonic metal songs